The SCMaglev (superconducting maglev, formerly called the MLU) is a magnetic levitation (maglev) railway system developed by Central Japan Railway Company (JR Central) and the Railway Technical Research Institute.

Technology

The SCMaglev system uses an electrodynamic suspension (EDS) system. The trains' bogies have superconducting magnets installed, and the guideways contain two sets of metal coils.
The current levitation system utilizes a series of coils wound into a "figure 8" along both walls of the guideway. These coils are also cross-connected underneath the track.

As the train accelerates, the magnetic fields of its superconducting magnets induce a current into these coils due to the magnetic field induction effect. If the train were centered with the coils, the electrical potential would be balanced and no currents would be induced. However, as the train runs on rubber wheels at relatively low speeds, the magnetic fields are positioned below the center of the coils, causing the electrical potential to no longer be balanced. This creates a reactive magnetic field opposing the superconducting magnet's pole (in accordance with Lenz's law), and a pole above that attracts it.

These coils also generate guiding and stabilizing forces. Because they are cross-connected underneath the guideway, if the train moves off-center, currents are induced into the connections that correct its positioning.
SCMaglev also utilizes a linear synchronous motor (LSM) propulsion system, which powers a second set of coils in the guideway.

History
Japanese National Railways (JNR) began research on a linear propulsion railway system in 1962 with the goal of developing a train that could travel between Tokyo and Osaka in one hour. Shortly after Brookhaven National Laboratory patented superconducting magnetic levitation technology in the United States in 1969, JNR announced development of its own superconducting maglev (SCMaglev) system. The railway made its first successful SCMaglev run on a short track at its Railway Technical Research Institute in 1972. 
JR Central plans on exporting the technology, pitching it to potential buyers.

Miyazaki test track
In 1977, SCMaglev testing moved to a new 7 km test track in Hyūga, Miyazaki. By 1980, the track was modified from a "reverse-T" shape to the "U" shape used today. In April 1987, JNR was privatized, and Central Japan Railway Company (JR Central) took over SCMaglev development.

In 1989, JR Central decided to build a better testing facility with tunnels, steeper gradients, and curves. After the company moved maglev tests to the new facility, the company's Railway Technical Research Institute began to allow testing of ground effect trains, an alternate technology based on aerodynamic interaction between the train and the ground, at the Miyazaki Test Track in 1999.

Yamanashi maglev test line

Construction of the Yamanashi maglev test line began in 1990. The  "priority section" of the line in Tsuru, Yamanashi, opened in 1997.

Commercial use

Japan 
In 2009, Japan's Ministry of Land, Infrastructure, Transport and Tourism decided that the SCMaglev system was ready for commercial operation. In 2011, the ministry gave JR Central permission to operate the SCMaglev system on their planned Chūō Shinkansen linking Tokyo and Nagoya by 2027, and to Osaka by 2037. Construction is currently underway.

United States 
Since 2010, JR Central has promoted the SCMaglev system in international markets, particularly the Northeast Corridor of the United States, as the Northeast Maglev. In 2013, Prime Minister Shinzō Abe met with the 44th U.S. President Barack Obama and offered to provide the first portion of the SC Maglev track free, a distance of approximately 40 miles. In 2016, the Federal Railroad Administration awarded $27.8 million to the Maryland Department of Transportation to prepare preliminary engineering and NEPA analysis for an SCMaglev train between Baltimore, MD, and Washington, DC.

Australia 
In late 2015, JR Central partnered with Mitsui and General Electric in Australia to form a joint venture named Consolidated Land and Rail Australia to provide a commercial funding model using private investors that could build the SC Maglev (linking Sydney, Canberra and Melbourne), create 8 new self-sustaining inland cities linked to the high speed connection, and contribute to the community.

Vehicles 

 1972 – LSM200
 1972 – ML100
 1975 – ML100A
 1977 – ML500
 1979 – ML500R (remodeled ML500)
 1980 – MLU001
 1987 – MLU002
 1993 – MLU002N
 1995 – MLX01 (MLX01-1, 11, 2)
 1997 – MLX01 (MLX01-3, 21, 12, 4)
 2002 – MLX01 (MLX01-901, 22)
 2009 – MLX01 (MLX01-901A, 22A: remodeled 901 and 22)
 2013 – L0 Series Shinkansen
 2020 – Revised L0 Series Shinkansen

Records

Manned records

Unmanned records

Relative passing speed records

See also 
 MAGLEV 2000
 Transrapid
 Krauss-Maffei Transurban - Electromagnetic suspension technology had been transferred from Krauss-Maffei.
 ROMAG
 Inductrack

References

Further reading

External links

SCMAGLEV Website
Central Japan Railway Company SCMAGLEV Official Website
Railway Technical Research Institute (RTRI)
RTRI Maglev website
The Northeast Maglev
SCMaglev trains
U.S.-Japan MAGLEV
Project information by The International Maglev Board

Electric railways in Japan
Experimental and prototype high-speed trains
Land speed record rail vehicles
Maglev
Magnetic propulsion devices